Laugh Your Blues Away is a 1942 American comedy film directed by Charles Barton and written by Harry Sauber and Ned Dandy. The film stars Jinx Falkenburg, Bert Gordon, Johnny Mitchell, Isobel Elsom, Roger Clark and George Lessey. The film was released on November 12, 1942, by Columbia Pictures.

Plot

Cast          
Jinx Falkenburg as Pam Crawford / Olga
Bert Gordon as Boris Rascalnikoff
Johnny Mitchell as Jimmy Westerly 
Isobel Elsom as Mrs. Westerly
Roger Clark as Blake Henley
George Lessey as Mr. Westerly
Vivien Oakland as Mrs. Conklin
Dick Elliott as Mr. Conklin
Phyllis Kennedy as Priscilla Conklin
Robert Greig as Wilfred
Frank Sully as Buck
Clyde Fillmore as Sen. Hargrave
Barbara Brown as Mrs. Hargrave
Edna Holland as Mrs. Watson
Edward Earle as Mr. Larkin
Wyndham Standing as Mr. Jamison
Florence Wix as Mrs. Jamison
Louise Squire as Blonde

References

External links
 

1942 films
1940s English-language films
American comedy films
1942 comedy films
Columbia Pictures films
Films directed by Charles Barton
American black-and-white films
1940s American films